The History of the Decline and Fall of the Roman Empire is a six-volume work by the English historian Edward Gibbon. It traces Western civilization (as well as the Islamic and Mongolian conquests) from the height of the Roman Empire to the fall of Byzantium in the fifteenth century. Volume I was published in 1776 and went through six printings. Volumes II and III were published in 1781; volumes IV, V, and VI in 1788–1789.

The six volumes cover the history, from 98 to 1590, of the Roman Empire, the history of early Christianity and then of the Roman State Church, and the history of Europe, and discusses the decline of the Roman Empire among other things.

Thesis 
Gibbon offers an explanation for the fall of the Roman Empire, a task made difficult by a lack of comprehensive written sources, though he was not the only historian to attempt it.

According to Gibbon, the Roman Empire succumbed to barbarian invasions in large part due to the gradual loss of civic virtue among its citizens. 
He began an ongoing controversy about the role of Christianity, but he gave great weight to other causes of internal decline and to attacks from outside the Empire. 

Like other Enlightenment thinkers and British citizens of the age steeped in institutional anti-Catholicism, Gibbon held in contempt the Middle Ages as a priest-ridden, superstitious Dark Age.  It was not until his own era, the "Age of Reason", with its emphasis on rational thought, it was believed, that human history could resume its progress.

Style

Gibbon's tone was detached, dispassionate, and yet critical. He can lapse into moralisation and aphorism:

Criticism
Numerous tracts were published criticising his work. In response, Gibbon defended his work with the 1779 publication of A Vindication ... of the Decline and Fall of the Roman Empire. 

Edward Gibbon's central thesis in his explanation of how the Roman Empire fell, that it was due to embracing Christianity, is not widely accepted by scholars today. Gibbon argued that with the empire's new Christian character, large sums of wealth that would have otherwise been used in the secular affairs in promoting the state were transferred to promoting the activities of the Church. However, the pre-Christian empire also spent large financial sums on religious affairs and it is unclear whether or not the change of religion increased the amount of resources the empire spent on religion. Gibbon further argued that new attitudes in Christianity caused many Christians of wealth to renounce their lifestyles and enter a monastic lifestyle, and so stop participating in the support of the empire. However, while many Christians of wealth did become monastics, this paled in comparison to the participants in the imperial bureaucracy. Although Gibbon further pointed out that the importance Christianity placed on peace caused a decline in the number of people serving the military, the decline was so small as to be negligible for the army's effectiveness.

Gibbon's apparent antagonism to Christian doctrine spilled over into the Jewish faith, leading to charges of anti-Semitism. For example, he wrote:From the reign of Nero to that of Antoninus Pius, the Jews discovered a fierce impatience of the dominion of Rome, which repeatedly broke out in the most furious massacres and insurrections. Humanity is shocked at the recital of the horrid cruelties which they committed in the cities of Egypt, of Cyprus, and of Cyrene, where they dwelt in treacherous friendship with the unsuspecting natives; and we are tempted to applaud the severe retaliation which was exercised by the arms of legions against a race of fanatics, whose dire and credulous superstition seemed to render them the implacable enemies not only of the Roman government, but also of mankind.

Misinterpretation of Byzantium
John Julius Norwich, despite his admiration for Gibbon's furthering of historical methodology, considered his hostile views on the Byzantine Empire flawed, and blamed him somewhat for the lack of interest shown in the subject throughout the 19th and early 20th centuries. This view might well be admitted by Gibbon himself: "But it is not my intention to expatiate with the same minuteness on the whole series of the Byzantine history." However, the Russian historian George Ostrogorsky wrote, "Gibbon and Lebeau were genuine historians – and Gibbon a very great one – and their works, in spite of factual inadequacy, rank high for their presentation of their material."

Gibbon's views on religion

Criticism of Quran and Muhammad

Gibbon was critical of the Quran and Muhammad. He outlined in chapter 33 the widespread tale of the Seven Sleepers, and remarked "This popular tale, which Mahomet might learn when he drove his camels to the fairs of Syria, is introduced, as a divine revelation, into the Quran." His presentation of Muhammad's life again reflected his anti-Islamic views: "in his private conduct, Mahomet indulged the appetites of a man, and abused the claims of a prophet. A special revelation dispensed him from the laws which he had imposed on his nation: the female sex, without reserve, was abandoned to his desires; and this singular prerogative excited the envy, rather than the scandal, the veneration, rather than the envy, of the devout Mussulmans."

Views on Jews and charge of antisemitism
Gibbon has been accused of antisemitism. He has described the Jews as "a race of fanatics, whose dire and credulous superstition seemed to render them the implacable enemies not only of the Roman government, but also of humankind."

Number of Christian martyrs
Gibbon challenged Church history by estimating far smaller numbers of Christian martyrs than had been traditionally accepted. The Church's version of its early history had rarely been questioned before. Gibbon, however, knew that modern Church writings were secondary sources, and he shunned them in favour of primary sources.

Christianity as a contributor to the fall and to stability: chapters XV, XVI
Historian S. P. Foster says that Gibbon:
blamed the otherworldly preoccupations of Christianity for the decline of the Roman empire, heaped scorn and abuse on the church, and sneered at the entirety of monasticism as a dreary, superstition-ridden enterprise. The Decline and Fall compares Christianity invidiously with both the pagan religions of Rome and the religion of Islam.

Gibbon's work was originally published in sections, as was common for large works at the time. The first two volumes were well-received and widely praised, but with the publication of volume 3, Gibbon was attacked by some as a "paganist" because he argued that Christianity (or at least the abuse of it by some of the clergy and its followers) had hastened the fall of the Roman Empire, as seen in this extended quote from chapter 38, part VI of Volume 3:

Voltaire was deemed to have influenced Gibbon's claim that Christianity was a contributor to the fall of the Roman Empire.  As one pro-Christian commentator put it in 1840:

Tolerant paganism

Gibbon wrote:

 He has been criticized for his portrayal of Paganism as tolerant and Christianity as intolerant. In an article that appeared in 1996 in the journal Past & Present, H. A. Drake challenges an understanding of religious persecution in ancient Rome, which he considers to be the "conceptual scheme" that was used by historians to deal with the topic for the last 200 years, and whose most eminent representative is Gibbon. Drake counters:

Gibbon's reflections
Gibbon's initial plan was to write a history "of the decline and fall of the city of Rome", and only later expanded his scope to the whole Roman Empire: If I prosecute this History, I shall not be unmindful of the decline and fall of the city of Rome; an interesting object, to which my plan was originally confined.

Although he published other books, Gibbon devoted much of his life to this one work (1772–1789). His autobiography Memoirs of My Life and Writings is devoted largely to his reflections on how the book virtually became his life. He compared the publication of each succeeding volume to a newborn child.

Editions
Gibbon continued to revise and change his work even after publication. The complexities of the problem are addressed in Womersley's introduction and appendices to his complete edition.
 In-print complete editions
 J.B. Bury, ed., seven volumes, seven editions, London: Methuen,  1898 to 1925, reprinted New York: AMS Press, 1974. .
 J.B. Bury, ed., two volumes, 4th edition New York: The Macmillan Company, 1914 Volume 1 Volume 2
 Hugh Trevor-Roper, ed., six volumes, New York: Everyman's Library, 1993–1994. The text, including Gibbon's notes, is from Bury but without his notes.  (vols. 1–3);  (vols. 4–6).
 David Womersley, ed., three volumes, hardback London: Allen Lane, 1994; paperback New York: Penguin Books, 1994, revised ed. 2005. Includes the original index, and the Vindication (1779), which Gibbon wrote in response to attacks on his caustic portrayal of Christianity. The 2005 print includes minor revisions and a new chronology.  (3360 p.);  (v. 1, 1232 p.);  (v. 2, 1024 p.);  (v. 3, 1360 p.)
 In-print abridgements
 David Womersley, abridged ed., one volume, New York: Penguin Books, 2000. Includes all footnotes and seventeen of the seventy-one chapters.  (848 p.)
 Hans-Friedrich Mueller, abridged ed., one volume, New York: Random House, 2003. Includes excerpts from all seventy-one chapters. It eliminates footnotes, geographic surveys, details of battle formations, long narratives of military campaigns, ethnographies and genealogies.  Based on the Rev. H.H. [Dean] Milman's edition of 1845 (see also Gutenberg e-text edition). , (trade paper, 1312 p.);  (mass market paper, 1536 p.)
 AMN, abridged ed., one volume abridgement, Woodland: Historical Reprints, 2019. It eliminates most footnotes, adds some annotations, and omits Milman's notes.  (large 8x11.5 trade paper 402 pages)

Legacy 
Many writers have used variations on the series title (including using "Rise and Fall" in place of "Decline and Fall"), especially when dealing with a large polity that has imperial characteristics. Piers Brendon notes that Gibbon's work "became the essential guide for Britons anxious to plot their own imperial trajectory. They found the key to understanding the British Empire in the ruins of Rome."
 
 
 
 
 
 
 
 
 
 
 
 
 
 
 
 
 
 
 
 
 
 
 

and in film:
 The Fall of the Roman Empire (1964), Anthony Mann
 The Decline of Western Civilization (1981), Penelope Spheeris
 The Decline of the American Empire (1986), Denys Arcand

and in television:
 Ancient Rome: The Rise and Fall of an Empire (2006)

and in video games:
  Rise and Fall: Civilizations at War (2006)
  Civilization VI: Rise and Fall (2018)

and in music:
  The Rise and Fall of Ziggy Stardust and the Spiders from Mars (1972), David Bowie

The title and author are also cited in Noël Coward's comedic poem "I Went to a Marvellous Party", and in the poem "The Foundation of Science Fiction Success", Isaac Asimov acknowledged that his Foundation series – an epic tale of the fall and rebuilding of a galactic empire – was written "with a tiny bit of cribbin' / from the works of Edward Gibbon". Feminist science fiction author Sheri S. Tepper gave one of her novels the title Gibbon's Decline and Fall.

In 1995, an established journal of classical scholarship, Classics Ireland, published punk musician Iggy Pop's reflections on the applicability of The Decline and Fall of the Roman Empire to the modern world in a short article, Caesar Lives, (vol. 2, 1995) in which he asserted:America is Rome. Of course, why shouldn't it be? We are all Roman children, for better or worse ... I learn much about the way our society really works, because the system-origins – military, religious, political, colonial, agricultural, financial – are all there to be scrutinised in their infancy. I have gained perspective.

See also
 Fall of the Western Roman Empire
 Outline of The History of the Decline and Fall of the Roman Empire
 William Strahan (publisher), who also first printed The Wealth of Nations (1776)

Notes

References

Further reading
 Brownley, Martine W. "Appearance and Reality in Gibbon's History," Journal of the History of Ideas 38:4 (1977), 651–666.
 Brownley, Martine W. "Gibbon's Artistic and Historical Scope in the Decline and Fall," Journal of the History of Ideas 42:4 (1981), 629–642.
 Cosgrove, Peter. Impartial Stranger: History and Intertextuality in Gibbon's Decline and Fall of the Roman Empire (Newark:  Associated University Presses, 1999) .
 Craddock, Patricia. "Historical Discovery and Literary Invention in Gibbon's 'Decline and Fall'," Modern Philology 85:4 (May 1988), 569–587.
 Drake, H.A., "Lambs into Lions: explaining early Christian intolerance," Past and Present 153 (1996), 3–36. Oxford Journals
 Furet, Francois. "Civilization and Barbarism in Gibbon's History," Daedalus 105:3 (1976), 209–216.
 Gay, Peter. Style in History (New York: Basic Books, 1974) .
 Ghosh, Peter R. "Gibbon's Dark Ages: Some Remarks on the Genesis of the Decline and Fall," Journal of Roman Studies 73 (1983), 1–23.
 Homer-Dixon, Thomas "The Upside of Down: Catastrophe, Creativity and the Renewal of Civilization", 2007 , Chapter 3 pp. 57–60
 Kelly, Christopher. "A Grand Tour: Reading Gibbon's 'Decline and Fall'," Greece & Rome 2nd ser., 44:1 (Apr. 1997), 39–58.
 Momigliano, Arnaldo. "Eighteenth-Century Prelude to Mr. Gibbon," in Pierre Ducrey et al., eds., Gibbon et Rome à la lumière de l'historiographie moderne (Geneva: Librairie Droz, 1977).
 Momigliano, Arnaldo. "Gibbon from an Italian Point of View," in G.W. Bowersock et al., eds., Edward Gibbon and the Decline and Fall of the Roman Empire (Cambridge: Harvard University Press, 1977).
 Momigliano, Arnaldo. "Declines and Falls," American Scholar 49 (Winter 1979), 37–51.
 Momigliano, Arnaldo. "After Gibbon's Decline and Fall," in Kurt Weitzmann, ed. Age of Spirituality : a symposium (Princeton: 1980); .
 Pocock, J.G.A. Barbarism and Religion, 4 vols.  Cambridge University Press.
 vol. 1, The Enlightenments of Edward Gibbon, 1737–1764, 1999 [hb: ];
 vol. 2, Narratives of Civil Government, 1999 [hb: ];
 vol. 3, The First Decline and Fall, 2003 [pb: ].
 vol. 4, Barbarians, Savages and Empires, 2005 [hb: ].
 The Work of J.G.A. Pocock: Edward Gibbon section.
 Roberts, Charlotte. Edward Gibbon and the Shape of History. 2014 Oxford University Press 
 Trevor-Roper, H.R. "Gibbon and the Publication of The Decline and Fall of the Roman Empire, 1776–1976," Journal of Law and Economics 19:3 (Oct. 1976), 489–505.
 Womersley, David. The Transformation of 'The Decline and Fall of the Roman Empire' (Cambridge: 1988).
 Womersley, David, ed. Religious Scepticism: Contemporary Responses to Gibbon (Bristol, England: Thoemmes Press, 1997).
 Wootton, David. "Narrative, Irony, and Faith in Gibbon's Decline and Fall," History and Theory 33:4 (Dec. 1994), 77–105.

External links

 
 The History of the Decline and Fall of the Roman Empire at Sacred Texts
 
 
 The History of the Decline and Fall of the Roman Empire and a Vindication of Some Passages in the 15th and 16th Chapters  at Internet Archive

1776 non-fiction books
1781 non-fiction books
1788 non-fiction books
1789 non-fiction books
18th-century history books
Book series introduced in 1776
Books about civilizations
Books critical of Christianity
Books critical of Islam
Declinism
English non-fiction books
Fall of the Western Roman Empire
Gothic Wars books
History books about ancient Rome
History books about the Byzantine Empire
Non-Islamic Islam studies literature
Works about the theory of history
Works by Edward Gibbon